Statue of Ulgulan is a proposed 150 feet tall statue of Birsa Munda, a tribal freedom fighter from the Eastern Indian state of Jharkhand. The statue will be built on NH 33 Ranchi-Jamshedpur national highway near Bundu. The announcement of Statue of Ulgulan has been made by the Ex-Deputy Chief Minister of Jharkhand and AJSU President Shri Sudesh Mahto at the Birsa Jan Panchayat held on 15 November 2016, the birth date of Bhagwan Birsa Birsa Munda at Ulihatu Village, Khunti after the unanimous approval by the Jan Panchayat. Birsa Munda's kin Sukhram Munda has been made the convener of the Statue of Ulgulan committee. The committee will go to every village in the region to apprise people about the statue and collect a stone from every household. The statue is expected to be built by 15 November 2018.

Bhagwan Birsa Munda's revolutionary call 'Abua Dishum, Abua Raj' (our state, our rule) was a source of inspiration and motivation for millions of tribal people who hailed from the land of Jharkhand and were a part of the Indian Freedom Struggle. The 150 ft tall and grand ‘Statue of Ulgulan’ is being built in the spirit to respect the fervour of Bhagwan Birsa Munda and as a tribute to his contribution towards the battle that was fought centuries ago against the Britishers and the idea of establishing the same was done on 15 November 2016 (his birthday) in Ulihatu (his birthplace) and the Bhumi Poojan was commenced on 9 June 2017. The statue shall set a record of being the tallest monument in India.

The initiative to build the ‘Statue of Ulgulan’ has been taken forward by the Ulgulan Foundation, which is being patronised by Shri Sukhram Munda (descendant - grandson - of Bhagwan Birsa Munda) and Mr Sudesh Mahto (Ex.Dy CM of Jharkhand). The construction of the towering 150 feet tall monument shall be taken forth by the contribution of the people of Jharkhand and not just by any single entity or individual. Thousands of villages and millions of people will contribute to its establishment. The location for the 'Statue of Ulgulan' is near the Bundu Surya Mandir, Jamshedpur-Ranchi Highway, Bundu and the land has been donated by Shri. Ramdurlabh Singh Munda. 

The Ulgulan Foundation has brought forward the movement of ‘Har Ghar se Pathar, Har Ghar se Sahyog’, which directs towards the idea that the statue will be built in the accordance of support of each and every village and individual household's contribution. Villages of Jharkhand will donate a stone slab, which shall have the name of the respective village engraved on it. The slabs collectively shall be placed in the shape of a mammoth memory wall just near the statue.

The idea behind establishing ‘The Statue of Ulgulan’ is not only to kindle a sense of patriotism amongst the locals but also to exhibit the glory and laurels of Jharkhand and Bhagwan Birsa Munda worldwide. The foundation believes that this statue will become a key tourist spot in the forthcoming years, and will also invite scholars and researchers to study on Bhagwan Birsa Munda.

References
5. "bhumi pujan of SOU". epaper.bhaskar.com

6. "Statue of ulgulan bhumi pujan" http://epaper.prabhatkhabar.com/c/19995583

Proposed statues in India